The Oxford e-Research Centre (OeRC) is part of the Department of Engineering Science within the University of Oxford in England and is a multidisciplinary Data science research and education institute.

The Centre was founded in 2006, and its work focuses on researching digital methodologies, information and computational solutions for academic research and industrial applications. OeRC has received EPSRC UK government funding. 

The Centre participated in SOCIAM: The Theory and Practice of Social Machines, led in Nigel Shadbolt with David De Roure, Director OeRC, as co-investigator. OeRC is home to over 50 researchers. Disciplines the Centre is involved in are as diverse as musicology and astronomy, including international collaborations such as the Square Kilometre Array.

In August 2017 the Centre integrated with the Department of Engineering Science, with  serving as the new head. Other faculty include Janet Pierrehumbert, Susanna-Assunta Sansone, Anne Trefethen and

References

2006 establishments in England
Educational institutions established in 2006
Organisations associated with the University of Oxford
Information technology research institutes
Research institutes in Oxford
Computer science institutes in the United Kingdom